is a Japanese businessman and former livedoor executive who hoped to become the fourth space tourist. He had trained at Star City, Moscow in Russia to fly with two members of Expedition 14 on board Soyuz TMA-9, which was launched on September 18, 2006.

However, on August 21, 2006, a Russian Federal Space Agency spokesman announced that Enomoto was "deemed not ready to fly for exclusively medical reasons", although he hinted that Enomoto might recover and join a later mission. His replacement on this particular flight was Iranian-American businesswoman Anousheh Ansari. 

Enomoto lodged a lawsuit against Virginia-based Space Adventures in which he hoped to reclaim the $21 million he paid the company over a two-year span. During the lawsuit, it was revealed that the "medical reason" was chronic kidney stones. Space Adventures claims it advised Enomoto to treat the kidney stones aggressively and when he did not, they had to disqualify him from spaceflight. Enomoto claims that he was misled about the kidney stones issue, and that the real reason for his disqualification was his refusal to provide additional funds to Space Adventures.

Enomoto would have been the first self-funded space tourist from Japan and Asia (journalist Toyohiro Akiyama flew on Soyuz TM-11 in 1990, and could be regarded as the first space business traveller). Enomoto's flight would have taken him to the International Space Station (ISS) after lifting off from the Baikonur Cosmodrome in Kazakhstan, the world's oldest spaceport.

Enomoto made international news when it was revealed that he intended to go into space wearing a costume akin to that of Char Aznable, a character from the anime series Mobile Suit Gundam. His planned experiment was to put together one or more Gundam models in zero gravity.

References

External links
 Spacefacts biography of Daisuke Enomoto
 Biography of Daisuke Enomoto on his own web site
 Space Adventures Announces Next Private Space Explorer
 Medical defeats 4th space tourist
 The Space Tourist Who Wasn't

Japanese businesspeople
1971 births
Living people
People from Chiba Prefecture
Space tourists